Matavun is a settlement near the entrance to Škocjan Caves in the Municipality of Divača in the Littoral region of Slovenia.

References

External links

Matavun on Geopedia

Populated places in the Municipality of Divača